Agustinus Adisutjipto (Perfected Spelling: Agustinus Adisucipto, 4 July 1916 – 29 July 29, 1947) was born in Salatiga, Central Java and raised as a Roman Catholic. He was the first pilot of Indonesian Air Force whose plane was shot down by the Dutch during the Indonesian National Revolution. He was posthumously declared a National Hero of Indonesia in 1974.

Early life 
Adisutjipto was born in Salatiga, Central Java, Dutch East Indies on 4 July 1916 and was firstborn of 4 brothers. His fathers, Roewidodarmo, was a school superintendent and devout catholic. Adisutjipto develop interest in aviation since early age, however his father disagree for him to pursue career in aviation. His father suggest him to become a doctor, the suggestion which he reluctantly follows. He then attend the school of medicine  in Batavia.

Unbeknownst to his father, he took exam to enter military flight school Militaire Luchtvaart Opleidings School in Kalijati, West Java and got accepted. Finally his father accepted his career choice. He then graduated from the flight school in 2 years (a year earlier than his peers) and became one of the only two native-Indonesians to obtain multi-engine pilot badge (Groot Militaire Brevet).

Career 
In 1939, Adisutjipto was assigned in reconnaissance squadron in Royal Netherlands East Indies Army Air Force (Militaire Luchtvaart van het Koninklijk Nederlands-Indisch Leger / ML-KNIL) with rank of second lieutenant (2e Luitenant), appointed as adjudant of Kapitein''' Clason  (a senior officer ML-KNIL), and appointed as secretary of ML-KNIL. He held those position until the invasion of the Dutch East Indies by Japan in 1942. Most of ML-KNIL pilots then were retreated to Australia, but he opted to stay in Java and was relieved from his duty.

In 1945, he joined the Republic of Indonesia Armed Forces to assist in establishment of Indonesian Air Force. He was tasked to establish the Flight School in Yogyakarta, in the Maguwo Air Field, later renamed Adisucipto Airport, to commemorate his services as a national hero.

On 27 October 1945, He flew a Yokosuka K5Y (locally referred as "Cureng") around Yogyakarta, thus making him the first pilot of newly born Indonesian Air Force who flew an aircraft.

During the first of two major Dutch police actions against the Republic of Indonesia, Operation Product, Adisujipto and Abdul Rahman Saleh were ordered to fly to India. They successfully breached the air blockade conducted by the Dutch air force, covering the airspace from Indonesia to India and Pakistan. However, during their journey back from Singapore, while transporting donated medical supplies from the Red Cross of Malaya at Singapore, their Dakota aircraft was shot down by two Dutch P-40 Kittyhawk aircraft in Dusun Ngoto on 29 July 1947, even though Indonesia had asked permission from Netherlands to deliver medical supplies. The remains of their Dakota VT-CLA can be seen in Dirgantara Mandala Museum. He was buried in the Kuncen I and II general cemetery.

 Recognition 

On 17 August 1952, the Indonesian Air Force renamed the Adisutjipto Air Force Base in Yogyakarta after him. This Air Force Base also serves civil aviation for the city.

On 9 November 1974, Adisutjipto was posthumously promoted to Air Vice-Marshal and named a National Hero of Indonesia by the President on behalf of the nation.

On 14 July 2000, his remains were re-interred in the Monumen Perjuangan'' (Monument of Struggle) in Dusun Ngoto, Bantul, Yogyakarta.

References 

1916 births
1947 deaths
National Heroes of Indonesia
Indonesian Christians
Indonesian Roman Catholics
Indonesian military personnel
People from Salatiga
Aviators killed by being shot down
Royal Netherlands Air Force personnel of World War II
Royal Netherlands East Indies Army officers
Royal Netherlands East Indies Army personnel of World War II